Jubilee Maidan Ground is a multi purpose stadium in Bhuj, Kutch, Gujarat, India. The ground is mainly used for organizing matches of football, cricket and other sports.  The stadium has hosted five first-class matches  in 1973 when Saurashtra cricket team played against Baroda cricket team. The ground hosted four more first-class matches in 1978 and 1980 but since then the stadium has not hosted any matches.

References

External links 

 cricketarchive
 cricinfo

Sports venues in Gujarat
Bhuj
Cricket grounds in Gujarat
Defunct cricket grounds in India
Sports venues completed in 1973
1973 establishments in Gujarat
20th-century architecture in India